In physics, natural abundance (NA) refers to the abundance of isotopes of a chemical element as naturally found on a planet. The relative atomic mass (a weighted average, weighted by mole-fraction abundance figures) of these isotopes is the atomic weight listed for the element in the periodic table. The abundance of an isotope varies from planet to planet, and even from place to place on the Earth, but remains relatively constant in time (on a short-term scale).

As an example, uranium has three naturally occurring isotopes: 238U, 235U, and 234U. Their respective natural mole-fraction abundances are 99.2739–99.2752%, 0.7198–0.7202%, and 0.0050–0.0059%. For example, if 100,000 uranium atoms were analyzed, one would expect to find approximately 99,274 238U atoms, approximately 720 235U atoms, and very few (most likely 5 or 6) 234U atoms. This is because 238U is much more stable than 235U or 234U, as the half-life of each isotope reveals: 4.468 × 109 years for 238U compared with 7.038 × 108 years for 235U and 245,500 years for 234U.

Exactly because the different uranium isotopes have different half-lives, when the Earth was younger, the isotopic composition of uranium was different. As an example, 1.7×109 years ago the NA of 235U was 3.1% compared with today's 0.7%, and that allowed a natural nuclear fission reactor to form, something that cannot happen today.

However, the natural abundance of a given isotope is also affected by the probability of its creation in nucleosynthesis (as in the case of samarium; radioactive 147Sm and 148Sm are much more abundant than stable 144Sm) and by production of a given isotope as a daughter of natural radioactive isotopes (as in the case of radiogenic isotopes of lead).

Deviations from natural abundance
It is now known from study of the Sun and primitive meteorites that the solar system was initially almost homogeneous in isotopic composition. Deviations from the (evolving) galactic average, locally sampled around the time that the Sun's nuclear burning began, can generally be accounted for by mass fractionation (see the article on mass-independent fractionation) plus a limited number of nuclear decay and transmutation processes. There is also evidence for injection of short-lived (now-extinct) isotopes from a nearby supernova explosion that may have triggered solar nebula collapse. Hence deviations from natural abundance on Earth are often measured in parts per thousand (per mille or ‰) because they are less than one percent (%).

An exception to this lies with the presolar grains found in primitive meteorites. These small grains condensed in the outflows of evolved ("dying") stars and escaped the mixing and homogenization processes in the interstellar medium and the solar accretion disk (also known as the solar nebula or protoplanetary disk). As stellar condensates ("stardust"), these grains carry the isotopic signatures of specific nucleosynthesis processes in which their elements were made. In these materials, deviations from "natural abundance" are sometimes measured in factors of 100.

Natural isotope abundance of some elements
The next table gives the terrestrial isotope distributions for some elements. Some elements, such as phosphorus and fluorine, only exist as a single isotope, with a natural abundance of 100%.

See also
 Abundance of the chemical elements
 Decay product
 Isotope
 Presolar grains
 Radionuclide

References

External links
 Berkeley Isotopes Project Interactive Table (archived 2015)
 Exact Masses of the Elements and Isotopic Abundances, Scientific Instrument Services
 Tools to compute low- and high-precision isotopic distribution (archived 2011)

Chemical properties
Isotopes